JOBS may refer to:

Job Opportunities and Basic Skills Training program, a welfare-to-work program created by the Family Support Act of 1988
Jumpstart Our Business Startups Act (2012), known as the JOBS Act
Jobs (film), a biographical film based on the life of Steve Jobs

See also
Jobs (disambiguation)